Qush Tappeh may refer to:
 Qush Tappeh, Golestan
 Qush Tappeh, Hamadan
 Qush Tappeh, Markazi
 Qush Tappeh, North Khorasan